Dughabad (also Romanized as Dūghābād) is a village in Kuhestan Rural District, Jazmurian District, Rudbar-e Jonubi County, Kerman Province, Iran. At the 2006 census, its population was 89, in 17 families.

References 

Populated places in Rudbar-e Jonubi County